The 1986 Chatham Cup was the 59th annual nationwide knockout football competition in New Zealand.

Up to the last 16 of the competition, the cup was run in three regions (northern, central, and southern). In a change to previous years, National League teams received a bye until Round Three (the final 64 stage) of the competition, one round earlier than previously. In all, 143 teams took part in the competition. Note: Different sources give different numberings for the rounds of the competition: some start round one with the beginning of the regional qualifications; others start numbering from the first national knock-out stage. The former numbering scheme is used in this article.

The 1986 final
Unlike previous years, the final was held over two legs, home and away. This format proved unpopular, and was abandoned after three years, with the cup reverting to a single final format in 1989. In the final North Shore United became the first six-times winner of the Chatham Cup.

The first leg was held at North Shore United's Fuji Film Stadium. The game was not a particularly memorable one, although it did have its moments, notably a penalty miss from the home side. This would have evened the tie up, as Mount Maunganui gained a lead halfway through the first half via a Tony Ferris goal. This proved to be the only goal of the match.

The second leg in Mount Maunganui was a more high-scoring and open game. Kevin Hagan opened the scoring for Shore after just five minutes. Mount Maunganui fought back to equalise through Grant Proudman halfway through the first spell, but Shore's Darren McClennan restored their lead before half time and - thanks to the away goals rule - put them on track for the trophy. Away goals were not to be needed, however, as both Kim Wright (after 65 minutes) and Brian McKeown (87 minutes) added to North Shore's tally, taking them to an aggregate 4-2 win.

The Jack Batty Memorial Trophy for player of the final was awarded to Duncan Cole of North Shore United.

Results

Third round

* Won on penalties by University Cowan (4-3)

Fourth round

Fifth round

* Won on penalties by Nelson United (11-10), Christchurch Technical (4-3), and Papatoetoe (4-3).

Sixth Round

Semi-finals

Final

North Shore United won 4-2 on aggregate.

References

Rec.Sport.Soccer Statistics Foundation New Zealand 1986 page
UltimateNZSoccer website 1986 Chatham Cup page

Chatham Cup
Chatham Cup
Chatham Cup
Chat